The first season of The Jack Benny Program consisted of four episodes, during 1950 and 1951.  This premiere television season of The Jack Benny Program overlapped with his radio program of the same name, which would continue until 1955, whereas this television program would last until 1965.  

Jack Benny was the show's host, creator and star.  Because he was unwilling to commit to the still-new technology of television on a weekly basis, the first television season of The Jack Benny Program did not include any more than these four sporadically scheduled special episodes; each was broadcast live as was typical during the Golden Age of Television. It was not until season 5 that the program would settle into a regular biweekly time slot.  The program was broadcast on CBS (until its final season), and the theme song is "Love in Bloom".

Episodes

References
 
 

1950 American television seasons
1951 American television seasons
Jack 01